Jackson County is a county in the U.S. state of Minnesota. As of the 2020 census, the population was 9,989. Its county seat is Jackson.

History
The county was created on May 23, 1857. It was named for Henry Jackson, the first merchant in St. Paul.

Geography
Jackson County lies on the south side of Minnesota. Its south border abuts the north border of the state of Iowa. The Des Moines River flows south-southeasterly through the central part of the county, thence into Iowa. The county terrain is hilly and carved with drainages and gullies. The area is devoted to agriculture. The terrain generally slopes to the south and east; its highest point is on the lower west border, at 1,545' (471m) ASL.

Lakes

 Andersons Marsh
 Boot Lake
 Chandler Lake
 Clear Lake (part)
 Clear Lake (Des Moines Township and Hunter Township)
 Fish Lake (part)
 Heron Lake (4 lakes, connected by streams, all called Heron Lake)
 Illinois Lake
 Independence Lake
 Iowa Lake (part)
 Lake Flaherty
 Laurs Lake
 Little Spirit Lake
 Loon Lake
 Pearl Lake
 Round Lake
 Rush Lake (Sioux Valley Township)
 Rush Lake (Minneota Township)
 Skunk Lake
 South Heron Lake
 Spirit Lake
 String Lake (part)
 Teal Lake
 Timber Lake

Protected areas

 Anderson County Park
 Bootleg State Wildlife Management Area
 Caraway State Wildlife Management Area
 Des Moines River Scientific and Natural Area
 Holthe Prairie Scientific and Natural Area
 Husen Scientific and Natural Area
 Kilen Woods State Park
 Laurs Lake State Wildlife Management Area
 Minnesota Slough State Wildlife Management Area
 Robertson County Park
 Sangl State Wildlife Management Area
 Summers State Wildlife Management Area

Major highways

  Interstate 90
  U.S. Highway 71
  Minnesota State Highway 60
  Minnesota State Highway 86
  Minnesota State Highway 264

Adjacent counties

 Cottonwood County - north
 Watonwan County - northeast
 Martin County - east
 Emmet County, Iowa - southeast
 Dickinson County, Iowa - south
 Osceola County, Iowa - southwest
 Nobles County - west

Demographics

2020 census

Note: the US Census treats Hispanic/Latino as an ethnic category. This table excludes Latinos from the racial categories and assigns them to a separate category. Hispanics/Latinos can be of any race.

2000 census
As of the 2000 census, there were 11,268 people, 4,556 households, and 3,116 families in the county. The population density was 16.0/sqmi (6.19/km2). There were 5,092 housing units at an average density of 7.24/sqmi (2.80/km2). The racial makeup of the county was 97.07% White, 0.09% Black or African American, 0.12% Native American, 1.38% Asian, 0.97% from other races, and 0.38% from two or more races. 1.86% of the population were Hispanic or Latino of any race. 51.9% were of German, 14.1% Norwegian and 5.6% American ancestry.

There were 4,556 households, out of which 29.80% had children under the age of 18 living with them, 60.00% were married couples living together, 5.40% had a female householder with no husband present, and 31.60% were non-families. 28.50% of all households were made up of individuals, and 13.40% had someone living alone who was 65 years of age or older. The average household size was 2.40 and the average family size was 2.95.

The county population contained 24.50% under the age of 18, 7.00% from 18 to 24, 25.30% from 25 to 44, 22.60% from 45 to 64, and 20.50% who were 65 years of age or older. The median age was 41 years. For every 100 females there were 100.60 males. For every 100 females age 18 and over, there were 99.30 males.

The median income for a household in the county was $36,746, and the median income for a family was $43,426. Males had a median income of $29,123 versus $20,860 for females. The per capita income for the county was $17,499. About 5.20% of families and 8.60% of the population were below the poverty line, including 11.00% of those under age 18 and 8.40% of those age 65 or over.

Communities

Cities

 Alpha
 Heron Lake
 Jackson (county seat)
 Lakefield
 Okabena
 Wilder

Census-designated place
 Fish Lake

Unincorporated  communities

 Bergen
 Miloma
 Petersburg
 Rost
 Sioux Valley
 Spafford

Townships

 Alba Township
 Belmont Township
 Christiania Township
 Delafield Township
 Des Moines Township
 Enterprise Township
 Ewington Township
 Heron Lake Township
 Hunter Township
 Kimball Township
 La Crosse Township
 Middletown Township
 Minneota Township
 Petersburg Township
 Rost Township
 Round Lake Township
 Sioux Valley Township
 Weimer Township
 West Heron Lake Township
 Wisconsin Township

Politics
Jackson County voters tended to vote Democratic in times past, but have selected the Republican Party candidate in every national election since 2000 (as of 2020).

See also
 National Register of Historic Places listings in Jackson County, Minnesota

References

External links
 Jackson County government's web site

 
Minnesota counties
1857 establishments in Minnesota Territory
Populated places established in 1857